Rhizopogon parvisporus is a small, truffle-like fungus in the family Rhizopogonaceae. Found in Canada, it was described as new to science in 1962 by Constance Bowerman, from collections made in Newfoundland.

Description
The roughly spherical to irregularly shaped fruitbodies of the fungus measure  in diameter when fresh, although they tend to shrink when dry. They have a hard, wrinkled surface that is yellowish brown or lighter in color. The peridium is 300–570 µm thick. The spores have the shape of narrow ellipsoids, and rarely exceed 5 µm in length. They often contain two oil droplets, but occasionally have three or four.

Habitat and distribution
The fungus is only known from Fort Smith (Northwest Territories), and Newfoundland. In the former location, it was found along a riverbank in spruce woods, while in the latter it grew on mossy slopes in thickets of alder and fir.

References

External links

Fungi of Canada
Rhizopogonaceae
Fungi described in 1992
Fungi without expected TNC conservation status